Záhorie is a military district (formerly formally also considered a municipality) in western Slovakia in the Malacky District in the Bratislava Region.

Since 1 July 2012 it is allowed to the wider public to enter a military district without permit. Military operations are taking place in the district and visitors have to obey rules of the military district and respect temporary or permanent entry restrictions.

Maps of the region, rules of movement in the military district  and time schedules of actions in the military district can be found on the web site the of Ministry of Defense, Slovak Republic.

References

External links
Slovakia statistics

Villages and municipalities in Malacky District